Frozen: Original Motion Picture Soundtrack is the soundtrack album to Disney's 2013 film of the same name with 8 songs written by Robert Lopez and Kristen Anderson-Lopez, and 22 score pieces composed by Christophe Beck. The soundtrack includes the critically acclaimed song "Let It Go"—film version performed by Idina Menzel: single version performed by Demi Lovato—which won the Academy Award for Best Original Song, the Grammy Award for Best Song Written for Visual Media, and the Critics' Choice Award for Best Song, and was nominated for the Golden Globe Award for Best Original Song.

Two editions of the soundtrack were released by Walt Disney Records on November 25, 2013: a single-disc regular edition, and a two-disc digipak deluxe edition, containing original demo recordings of songs and score compositions, unused outtake recordings, and instrumental versions of the film's main songs. On October 21, 2013, the soundtrack's lead single, Lovato's cover of  "Let It Go" was released. Subsequent releases have been accompanied by foreign language translations of "Let It Go".

The album debuted at number 18 on the Billboard 200 chart. The soundtrack has topped the Billboard album chart for thirteen non-consecutive weeks, and  has sold 4 million copies in the U.S. The album has been certified triple-Platinum by the Recording Industry Association of America, and peaked at number one on the aforementioned chart, becoming the fourth soundtrack album from an animated film to reach that milestone.

Commercial performance 
As of December 11, 2014, the soundtrack for Frozen had had forty-three nonconsecutive weeks on top of Billboard Top Soundtracks. On the US Billboard 200, the album debuted at No. 18, the highest chart position for the soundtrack in an animated film since the 2006 film Cars. It later moved up to No. 10, becoming the tenth soundtrack from an animated film to reach top 10. The soundtrack subsequently moved to No. 4, which is the highest position for an animated film soundtrack since Disney's Pocahontas in 1995. In the week ending January 5, 2014, Frozen reached No. 1, surpassing Beyoncé's self-titled album (which had previously held the No. 1 position for three weeks after its unannounced release in December 2013) to become the fourth animated film soundtrack in history to reach this position. It remained at number one for a second consecutive week, becoming the first theatrical film soundtrack to stay at No. 1 for multiple weeks since Dreamgirls (also featuring Beyoncé) in early 2007, and the first animated film to spend more than one week at No. 1 since Disney's The Lion King in 1994 and 1995. With thirteen non-consecutive weeks at number one, Frozen earned the most weeks at No. 1 for an album since Adele's 21 (24 weeks) and the most weeks at No. 1 for a soundtrack since Titanic in 1998.

Frozen was the fifth best-selling soundtrack album in the US in 2013 with 338,000 copies sold for the year.  Frozen continued to be the best-selling album in the US and the only album to sell more than a million units in the first half of 2014 with nearly 2.7 million units. The song "Let It Go" performed by Idina Menzel also finished at No. 15 on the digital song chart with 2.8 million copies sold in the first six months of 2014. The soundtrack reached its 3 million sales mark in the US in July 2014. Nearly half these were digital sales, making the album the best-selling soundtrack in digital history. Frozen was Billboard Year-End number one album of 2014, becoming the sixth soundtrack in history and the first soundtrack to earn this position since Titanic, as well as the second Disney album to reach this position (the first one is the soundtrack to Mary Poppins). It became the second best-selling album of 2014 with 3,527,000 sold for the year. As of April 2015, it had sold 4 million copies in the US. In Canada, the album has sold 202,000 copies in 2014 as of November 26, 2014. The album sold a total of 226,000 copies in Canada in 2014.

Worldwide, Frozen sold over 10 million copies in 2014 alone. It was the year's best-selling album globally. An exclusive vinyl LP edition of the soundtrack was released in March 2014. A version of the soundtrack featuring only the first ten tracks was released under the name Frozen: The Songs.

Awards and recognition 
At the 57th Annual Grammy Awards, the Frozen soundtrack was nominated in two categories – Best Compilation Soundtrack for Visual Media and Best Score Soundtrack for Visual Media (with credits going to Christophe Beck as composer) – and won the former; the song "Let It Go" won the award for Best Song Written for Visual Media, with credits going to Kristen Anderson-Lopez and Robert Lopez as songwriters and Idina Menzel as performer. The Academy Award for "Let It Go" led Robert Lopez to become the youngest person to have achieved an EGOT.

Track listing 

All songs are written by Kristen Anderson-Lopez and Robert Lopez. All scores are composed by Christophe Beck, with tracks 11 and 31 co-composed by Frode Fjellheim

Charts

Weekly charts

Year-end charts

Decade-end charts

Tracks

Certifications

References

External links 
 

2013 soundtrack albums
Disney animation soundtracks
Fantasy film soundtracks
Grammy Award for Best Compilation Soundtrack for Visual Media
Musical film soundtracks
Pop soundtracks
Various artists albums
Walt Disney Records soundtracks
Frozen (franchise) mass media